Limbic system-associated membrane protein (LAMP) 64- to 68-kDa heavily glycosylated protein found in neurons, specifically it is distributed in cortical and subcortical regions of the limbic system. LAMP protein is expressed on the surface of somata and proximal dendrites of neurons where it integrates via glycosyl-phosphatidyl-inositol (GPI) anchor. Despite the name, LAMP is not expressed only in the limbic-associated areas, but also less intensely in the midbrain and hindbrain regions.

References 

Membrane proteins
Neurons
Limbic system